The PFL 6 mixed martial arts event for the 2022 season of the Professional Fighters League was held on July 1, 2022, at the Overtime Elite Arena in Atlanta, Georgia. This marked the sixth regular season event of the tournament and included fights in the Women's Lightweight and Welterweight divisions.

Background 
The event was to be headlined by a women's lightweight clash between the 2019 and 2021 champion Kayla Harrison will face former Bellator Women's Featherweight Champion Julia Budd. However, a week before the event, Budd pulled out due to injury and was replaced by Kaitlin Young.

The co-main event featured former Bellator Welterweight champion Rory MacDonald face off against Sadibou Sy. The rest of the main card saw a welterweight bout between 2019 and 2021 champion Ray Cooper III against Bellator MMA and ACA vet Brett Cooper while Magomed Magomedkerimov was scheduled to face off against João Zeferino. At weigh-ins, Zeferino didn't weigh in and was replaced in his bout against Magomed Magomedkerimov by Dilano Taylor.

A welterweight bout between Gleison Tibau and Nikolai Aleksakhin was scheduled at this event, however Tibau pulled out of the bout and was replaced by Carlos Leal. After making weight, Aleksakhin withdrew from the bout due to complications. Leal receives a walkover win and 3 points in the welterweight standings.

Results

Standings After Event 
The PFL points system is based on results of the match.  The winner of a fight receives 3 points.  If the fight ends in a draw, both fighters will receive 1 point. The bonus for winning a fight in the first, second, or third round is 3 points, 2 points, and 1 point respectively. The bonus for winning in the third round requires a fight be stopped before 4:59 of the third round.  No bonus point will be awarded if a fighter wins via decision.  For example, if a fighter wins a fight in the first round, then the fighter will receive 6 total points. A decision win will result in three total points.  If a fighter misses weight, the opponent (should they comply with weight limits) will receive 3 points due to a walkover victory, regardless of winning or losing the bout;  if the non-offending fighter subsequently wins with a stoppage, all bonus points will be awarded.

Welterweight

Women's Lightweight

Reported payout 
The following is the reported payout to the fighters as reported to the Georgia Athletic Commission. It is important to note the amounts do not include sponsor money, discretionary bonuses, viewership points or additional earnings.

 Kayla Harrison: $500,000 ($500,000 show, no win bonus) def. Kaitlin Young: $20,000
 Sadibou Sy: $52,000 ($26,000 show + $26,000 win) def. Rory MacDonald: $250,000
 Ray Cooper: $200,000 ($150,000 show + $50,000 win) def. Brett Cooper: $20,000
 Magomed Magomedkerimov: $200,000 ($100,000 show + $100,000 win) def. Dilano Taylor: $13,000
 Larissa Pacheco: $48,000 ($24,000 show + $24,000 win) def. Genah Fabian: $20,000
 Magomed Umalatov: $32,000 ($16,000 show + $16,000 win) def. Jarrah Hussein: $56,000
 Marina Mokhnatkina: $32,000 ($16,000 show + $16,000 win) def. Abigail Montes: $13,000
 Martina Jindrova: $42,000 ($21,000 show + $21,000 win) def. Zamzagul Fayzallanova: $10,000
 Olena Kolesnyk: $22,000 ($11,000 show + $11,000 win) def. Vanessa Melo: $13,000

See also 

 List of PFL events
 List of current PFL fighters

References 

Events in Atlanta
Professional Fighters League
2022 in mixed martial arts
July 2022 sports events in the United States